Storstrømmen (lit. The Great Stream) is a strait in Denmark separating the island Falster from the island Zealand.

Geography 

Smålandsfarvandet sound is situated to the west and Grønsund lies to the east. Storstrøm Bridge crosses Storstrømmen between the islands of Falster and Masnedø. The southernmost of the Farø Bridges crosses Storstrømmen between Falster and Farø.

See also
Geography of Denmark

References

External links
 

Straits of Denmark
Straits of the Baltic Sea